The Sweet Life Stakes is a Listed American Thoroughbred horse race for three years old fillies over the distance of about six and one-half furlongs on the downhill turf course scheduled annually in February at Santa Anita Park in Arcadia, California.  The event currently carries a purse of $100,000.

History 
The race was inaugurated in 2010 and was raced on the downhill turf course over the about  furlongs distance. 

The event is named in honor of the 2009 Kentucky Broodmare of the Year Sweet Life. Sweet Life was the dam of 2004 American Champion Two-Year-Old Filly Sweet Catomine and 2009 GI Breeders' Cup Ladies' Classic winner Life Is Sweet.
Also Sweet Life was victorious in the 1999 Providencia Stakes at Santa Anita Park.

In 2019 the event was upgraded to a Grade III event but was run on the dirt track due to inclement weather.

In 2020 the event was run at a distance of  furlongs on turf, using the backstretch start and in 2021 the distance was increased to six furlongs. In 2022 the event was scheduled on the original downhill turf course at the about six and one-half furlongs distance. 

In 2023 the American Graded Stakes Committee downgraded the event to a Listed race.

Records
Speed record: 
 about  furlongs – 1:12.00  –  Rose Catherine  (2010)

Margins: 
   lengths – Rose Catherine  (2010)

Most wins by a jockey
 2 – Rafael Bejarano  (2013, 2014)

Most wins by a trainer
 3 – Peter L. Miller   (2014, 2018, 2020)

Most wins by an owner:
 2 - Gary Barber  (2018, 2020)

Winners 

Legend:

See also
List of American and Canadian Graded races

References 

Graded stakes races in the United States
Grade 3 stakes races in the United States
2010 establishments in California
Flat horse races for three-year-old fillies
Horse races in California
Turf races in the United States
Recurring sporting events established in 2010
Santa Anita Park